Tramm may refer to:

Tramm, Mecklenburg-Vorpommern, a municipality in the district of Parchim, Mecklenburg-Vorpommern, Germany
Tramm, Schleswig-Holstein, a municipality in the district of Lauenburg, Schleswig-Holstein, Germany
Tramm, a character in the Teen Titans animated series